World Baseball Softball Confederation (WBSC) is the world governing body for the sports of baseball, softball, and Baseball5. It was established in 2013 by the merger of the International Baseball Federation (IBAF) and International Softball Federation (ISF), the former world governing bodies for baseball and softball, respectively. Under WBSC's organizational structure, IBAF and ISF now serve as the Baseball Division and Softball Division of WBSC. Each division is governed by an executive committee, while the WBSC is governed by an executive board.

Headquartered in Pully, Switzerland, the WBSC was granted recognition as the sole competent global authority for both the sports of baseball and softball by the International Olympic Committee at the 125th IOC Session on 8 September 2013.

The WBSC has 208 National Federation Members in 141 countries and territories across Asia, Africa, Americas, Europe and Oceania. Professional baseball organizations as well as youth organizations are also included and form an arm of the WBSC as associate members.

As the recognised governing body of baseball, softball, and Baseball5, the WBSC is charged with overseeing all international competitions and holds the exclusive rights of all competitions, tournaments and world championships featuring National Teams. These rights extend to the Olympic Games. WBSC's members hold the rights to organize and select National Teams. This exclusive authority of the WBSC and its members in each constituent country to sanction and regulate the sport of baseball applies in the 141 territories in which the WBSC has an associated National Federation.

Discussions to merge the two separate world governing bodies for the sports of baseball and softball were sparked by a Memorandum of Understanding that saw baseball and softball leaders agree to form a joint bid to be added to the 2020 Olympic Games sports program. Baseball and softball were dropped from the 2012 Summer Olympic program and were scheduled to be reinstated for the 2020 Olympics, but the 2020 Olympics were delayed due to the COVID-19 international pandemic. In August 2021, the International Olympic Committee announced that baseball and softball would not be part of the 2024 Paris Olympics. Baseball5 is still set to feature in the 2026 Youth Olympics.

History

Following its exclusion of baseball and softball from the Summer Olympics in 2005, the IOC reclassified baseball and softball as two disciplines of the same sport. As the IOC's guidance indicated the necessity for baseball and softball to be jointly considered for reinstatement in the Olympic programme, the two independent International Federations set out on a path toward a full and complete merger.

In 2012, the International Baseball Federation (IBAF) and the International Softball Federation (ISF) laid out the essential ground rules for partnership and began working on a constitution that would guide the merger and provide a framework for governance, ethics and operations. At a historic IBAF Congress in Tokyo in April 2013, the Constitution was ratified and since it had already been approved by an ISF working group empowered to do so, the WBSC was officially formalized and empowered.

The creation of a single federation allowed for the permanent alignment, merger and management of baseball and softball at the world level. The merger resulted in an immediate boost to the governance, universality and gender equality of baseball and softball, criteria for an Olympic sport that are heavily valued by the IOC.

At the first-ever World Baseball Softball Congress—in Hammamet, Tunisia—Italy's Fraccari was elected to a seven-year term as the first president of WBSC, along with a fully elected Executive Board.

Creation of Baseball5 

In 2017, the WBSC introduced a third discipline to be played at an international level, Baseball5 (B5), which is a five-on-five, five-inning game designed to be played with only a rubber ball on a small field. It is targeted at underserved communities, as well as offering a low-cost and fast-paced entry point to baseball and softball in new places around the world. The WBSC introduced it to aid its ultimate goal of having a billion-strong baseball-softball community by 2030. A major difference between B5 and baseball/softball is that the game is played without a pitcher, with the batter starting each play with the ball. It was inspired by various Latin American street games, such as "cuatro esquinas" (four corners) in Cuba, and has been played in some international tournaments in the Americas and Europe, as well as having been implemented in some schools in various countries. It is due to feature in the 2026 Youth Olympic Games, and has two World Cups for youth and senior players alternating each year starting in 2022, with both of these international events being played in a mixed-gender format. The WBSC is also planning to, as part of its general push into E-Sports, introduce a video game version of Baseball5 in the near future.

Organizational structure
The WBSC is governed by the executive board, which consists of fourteen members: president, secretary general, two vice presidents, baseball executive vice president, softball executive vice president, treasurer, four members at large, athlete representative for baseball, athlete representative for softball, and global ambassador.

The Baseball Division is governed by an executive committee, which has thirteen members: president, secretary general, 2nd vice president, 3rd vice president, treasurer, three members at large, four continental vice presidents (one each for Africa, Americas, Europe, and Oceania), and executive director.

The Softball Division is governed by an executive committee that has twenty-three members: president, secretary general, 1st vice president, 2nd vice president, treasurer, twelve vice presidents (two each for Africa, Asia, Europe, Latin America, and Oceania, and one each for North America and English-speaking Caribbean), two at-large members, two athlete representatives, immediate past president, and executive director.

The WBSC has four departments: media, finance, tournaments, and marketing. It also has several commissions.

Members

Besides its worldwide institutions, there are five regional governing bodies that oversee the game in the different continents and regions of the world.

WBSC Africa (28 members)
WBSC Americas (58 members)
WBSC Asia (34 members)
WBSC Europe (54 members)
WBSC Oceania (24 members)

In total, WBSC recognizes 198 national associations, with 132 national baseball teams as well as 122 women's national teams.

Unlike the ICC, the WBSC identifies associate members as those who particularly endorse international baseball and softball with their own leagues in partnership with the WBSC. These leagues support baseball and softball to the extent that they are major sports in their respective countries. The table below has all leagues along with the country hosted:

WBSC competitions

Baseball
Men's
 World Baseball Classic
 WBSC Premier12
 Olympic baseball tournament
 U-23 Baseball World Cup
 U-18 Baseball World Cup
 U-15 Baseball World Cup
 U-12 Baseball World Cup
Women's
 Women's Baseball World Cup

Softball
Men's
 Men's Softball World Cup
 U-23 Men's Softball World Cup
 U-18 Men's Softball World Cup
Women's
 Women's Softball World Cup
 Olympic softball tournament
 U-18 Women's Softball World Cup
 U-15 Women's Softball World Cup
Mixed
 U-12 Softball World Cup

Baseball5
 Baseball5 World Cup
 Youth Baseball5 World Cup
 Summer Youth Olympics

Current title holders

WBSC World Rankings

Men's baseball
The following table has the Top 20 men's baseball countries in the world.

Men's softball

Women's baseball

Women's softball
The following table has the Top 20 women's softball countries in the world.

Baseball5 (Coed)

See also
Baseball awards#International
Softball at the Summer Olympics
Baseball at the Summer Olympics

References

External links

 
 
Baseball in Switzerland
 
Bas
International sports organizations
Baseball
Organisations based in Lausanne
Softball in Switzerland
Softball organizations
Sports organizations established in 2013